Holzminde is a river of Lower Saxony, Germany. It flows into the Weser in Holzminden.

See also
List of rivers of Lower Saxony

References

Rivers of Lower Saxony
Solling
Rivers of Germany